Lindapterys is a genus of sea snails, marine gastropod mollusks in the family Muricidae, the murex snails or rock snails.

Species
Species within the genus Lindapterys include:
 † Lindapterys alata (Millet, 1865) 
 † Lindapterys cervantesorum Goret, Ledon & Pons, 2013 
 Lindapterys domlamyi Garrigues & Merle, 2014
 Lindapterys murex (Hedley, 1922)
 † Lindapterys poppelacki (Hörnes, 1853) 
 Lindapterys sanderi Petuch, 1987
 Lindapterys soderiae Callea, Volpi, Martignoni & Borri, 2001
 Lindapterys vokesae Petuch, 1987
Species brought into synonymy
 Lindapterys rosalimae Barros, 1990: synonym of Lindapterys sanderi Petuch, 1987
 Lindapterys soderii Callea, Volpi, Martignoni & Borri, 2001: synonym of Lindapterys soderiae Callea, Volpi, Martignoni & Borri, 2001

References

 Petuch E.J. (1987). New Caribbean molluscan faunas. Charlottesville, Virginia: The Coastal Education and Research Foundation. 154 pp., 29 pls; addendum 2 pp., 1 pl.

 
Ergalataxinae